David Alan Marcis (born March 1, 1941) is an American former professional stock car racing driver on the NASCAR Winston Cup circuit whose career spanned five decades. Marcis won five times over this tenure, twice at Richmond, including his final win in 1982, and collected 94 top-fives and 222 top-tens. His best championship results were second in 1975, fifth in 1978, sixth in 1974, 1976 and 1982, and ninth in 1970, 1980 and 1981.

Marcis competed in the Daytona 500 every year from 1968 until 1999. The 2002 Daytona 500 was the last time Marcis raced in NASCAR.

Career overview
Marcis' career is notable in the history of the NASCAR Winston Cup Series. While he is best known as the last of the non-factory supported independent owner drivers, he is also known as one of the top drivers of the 1970s. During his career, he drove for series championship car owners Nord Krauskopf and Rod Osterlund. Marcis retired in second place on the all-time starts list with 883 behind Richard Petty. Ricky Rudd and Terry Labonte have since passed him on the list. If there was ever a driver who could get the most out of his equipment on a shoestring budget, it was Dave Marcis.
 Marcis often owned and drove the No. 71 car. He finished eight times in the top-10 season drivers' points.

1970s

Marcis finished as high as second in the season standing in 1975 driving Nord Krauskopf's K & K Dodge Charger in the first year for NASCAR's modern standard of calculating points. Despite driving for some of the top teams of the day, Marcis opted to field his own teams following his sudden departure from Osterlund Racing after the 1978 season. Marcis was replaced by future seven-time champion Dale Earnhardt, who began his rookie campaign the following year. Former crew Harry Hyde once said of Marcis, "he had the talent to be a champion, if only he weren't so stubborn."

1980s
Marcis experienced moderate success as an owner driver during the 1980s. In 1981, he went upside down during a race at Atlanta after hitting two tractor tires at the entrance of pit road while trying to avoid a spinning Tim Richmond. The highlight of Marcis' career as an owner-driver was winning at the old Richmond Fairgrounds in 1982 driving a very un-raceable looking 81 Chevy Malibu. Marcis was a lap down, but made up the lap when the race leader Joe Ruttman spun out and Marcis passed him. All three drivers that were ahead of Marcis pitted and he assumed the lead as it began to rain. The race was called complete as darkness set in, and Marcis was declared the winner. Marcis described the win, "I wasn't praying for rain, but I told the guys when I got out of the car (during the break before the race was canceled) that if the good Lord wanted to help an independent, this was his chance." "It was one of my greatest moments in racing," Marcis said. "I had even built my own engine for that race." From that point Marcis' team gradually became less competitive as more well-funded teams found their way into the series. Marcis was occasionally known to moonlight for other car owners such as Larry Hedrick (later of Hedrick Motorsports). Often Marcis would still field his own car, usually with Jim Sauter behind the wheel.

1990s and 2000s

In the 1990 Pepsi 400 practice Marcis crashed into Darrell Waltrip's car. Both were injured in the crash and Waltrip missed six races. Marcis' car was destroyed and they did not have a backup, so they made a partnership to run J. D. McDuffie's Pontiac when McDuffie failed to qualify. Since Marcis was injured he was replaced in the first laps of the race by McDuffie as a relief driver but since Marcis started the race he was credited with the 20th-place finish.

Late in the 1992 season, Larry Hedrick Motorsports hired Marcis to replace Greg Sacks in their #41 car, he ran 7 races before being released. He returned to his car, who he had hired Jim Sauter to run.

Near the end of his career Marcis landed the first major Internet sponsor in Winston Cup, Prodigy Internet. This company sponsored Marcis as an associate and primary sponsor between 1994 and 1996, to where at the 1996 Daytona 500 Marcis was able to display a showcar, a first for his career. Marcis had a horrific accident at Pocono in June 1999 when, after getting loose in turn two on the 91st lap, he overcorrected it to the right and slammed the wall head-on at a high speed, sending his car airborne and completely destroying it. He climbed out of the wreckage without injury. Marcis was frequently the test driver for the Richard Childress GM Goodwrench No. 3 of his friend Dale Earnhardt during the prime of his career. This agreement with Childress was made by Marcis to help fund his own race team, although he rarely had the time to test his own equipment.

Marcis finished his career at the 2002 Daytona 500, setting a record for most Daytona 500s run with 33. Goodyear awarded him with a special bronze trophy shaped like his signature wingtip shoes and Goodyear hat.

Marcis started 16th in the 1994 Brickyard 400, but a crash during the race relegated him to a 41st-place finish.

Marcis was a test driver for the IROC and the Nextel Cup series after his retirement from racing competition in early 2002. He currently resides with his wife in the Asheville, North Carolina, area.

Motorsports career results

NASCAR
(key) (Bold – Pole position awarded by qualifying time. Italics – Pole position earned by points standings or practice time. * – Most laps led.)

Grand National Series

Winston Cup Series

Daytona 500

Busch Series

SuperTruck Series

International Race of Champions
(key) (Bold – Pole position. * – Most laps led.)

References

External links

 

Living people
1941 births
Sportspeople from Wausau, Wisconsin
Racing drivers from Wisconsin
NASCAR drivers
International Race of Champions drivers
American Speed Association drivers
NASCAR team owners
USAC Stock Car drivers
Team Penske drivers